PC Tools is a collection of software utilities for DOS developed by Central Point Software.

History of development 

The original PC Tools package was first developed as a suite of utilities for DOS, released for retail in 1985 for $39.95.

With the introduction of version 4.0, the name was changed to PC Tools Deluxe, and the primary interface became a colorful graphical shell (previously the shell resembled PC BOSS and was monochrome.) By version 7.0 of the package in 1991 several Windows programs had been added to it.  

Though the 7.0 version sold well, it was criticised in computer trade publications for being overcomplicated and riddled with bugs.  It was widely considered to have been rushed to publication, despite the objections of many of Central Point Software's employees.   PC Tools PRO (Version 9) for DOS was the last stable version released by Central Point Software before acquisition. 

In June 1994 Central Point was acquired by their top competitor Symantec. The package MORE PC Tools was released by Symantec's Central Point Division in October 1994 and included additional utilities: Backtrack, CrashGuard Pro (ex-Central Point Recuperator), DriveCheck, DriveSpeed. After that the product line was ultimately discontinued. PC Tools was the main competitor to Norton Utilities, which Symantec had acquired in 1990.  

Symantec now uses the PC Tools brand name—acquired from an Australian security vendor in 2008—for low-cost antivirus and antispyware software

The PC Tools brand was retired on December 4, 2013, and the website now refers visitors to products in Symantec's Norton product line.

Utilities included 

 PC Shell — a file manager, capable amongst other things of displaying the contents of data files used by various popular database, word-processor, and spreadsheet packages
 PC-Cache — a licensed disk cache of HyperCache from the HyperDisk Speed Kit
 PC-Secure - a file encryption utility
 Central Point Anti-Virus — an antivirus program.
 Central Point Backup — a backup utility for archiving and restoring data to and from disc or tape. In earlier releases, this utility was officially named "PC Backup". Innovative features included compression during backup and floppy disk spanning, and optional use of the Central Point Option Board for 33% faster disk writing.
 DiskFix — a utility for repairing on-disc file system data structures of a disc volume
 DiskEdit — a Disk editor
 Unformat — a utility that attempts to reverse the effects of a high-level format of a disc volume
 Undelete — a utility that attempts to recover a deleted file
 Mirror — a tool for storing the File Allocation Table to permit recovery of high-level formatted disks in combination with Unformat
 Compress — a disc volume defragmentation utility
 FileFix — a utility for repairing corruption to the data files used by various popular database, wordprocessor, and spreadsheet packages
 Commute — a remote control utility
 VDefend — a memory-resident computer virus detection utility
 SysInfo — a system information utility, incorporating diagnostics from 1993 onwards.  The diagnostics were licensed from the Eurosoft product Pc-Check
 Central Point Desktop (CPS) — an alternative Windows desktop shell, supporting nested icon groups, file manager, resource monitoring dashboard, virtual desktops, launch menus and many other features

The Mirror, Undelete, and Unformat utilities were licensed by Central Point to Microsoft for inclusion in MS-DOS 5.0. Central Point Anti-Virus and VDefend were licensed as Microsoft AntiVirus and VSafe, respectively, in MS-DOS 6.0 through 6.22.

References

Notes

Further reading 
 
 

Utility software
DOS software
1986 software